Separate Special Operations Center "East" named after Prince Svyatoslav Khorobroy (OC SpO) (Ukrainian: Окремий центр спеціальних операцій «Схід» імені князя Святослава Хороброго) is a formation of special forces as part of the Special Operations Forces of the Armed Forces of Ukraine. It was subordinate to the 4th Special Intelligence Service of the Main Intelligence Directorate of the Ministry of Defense of Ukraine. The unit is in Kropyvnytskyi. It is part of the United Rapid Response Forces.

The regiment was formed on the basis of the 10th Separate Brigade of Special Purpose of the Main Reconnaissance Directorate (GRU) of the Soviet Armed Forces. The regiment participated in the war in Donbas.

Since 2018, the regiment has been named after Prince Svyatoslav the Brave, the ruler of Kievan Rus' of the 10th century.

History 
With the Independence of Ukraine, on 11 October 1991, the 10th Special Brigade of the USSR was resubordinated to the Minister of Defense of Ukraine, and the personnel of the military unit took an oath of loyalty to the Ukrainian people.

Until the fall of 1997, the brigade was under the operational command of the 32nd Army Corps.

By the directive of the Minister of Defense of Ukraine dated 3 June 1998, the 10th OBr SpP was reformed into the 1st Separate Special Purpose Regiment (1 OP SpP 32 AK). According to the results of 1999-2000, the 1st OP SpP was recognized by the commander of the forces of the Southern OK of the Ground Forces of the Armed Forces of Ukraine as one of the best parts of the Southern Operational Command.

On September 7, 2000, the 1st Separate Special Purpose Regiment was renamed the 3rd Separate Special Purpose Regiment and in July 2003 was relocated from the city of Staryi Krym to the city of Kropyvnytskyi (then Kirovohrad).

Representatives of the regiment represented the Armed Forces of Ukraine for two years in a row at international competitions of intelligence groups held in Slovakia, where they won prizes among teams from more than ten participating countries.

War in Donbas 

In June 2014, the soldiers of the regiment defended the storage bases of armored weapons in Artemivsk.

In July 2014, a detachment of the regiment carried out a pilot evacuation operation near Snizhny. The group was surrounded, 10 people died together with the group commander, Lt. Col. Serhii Lysenko.

Special forces of the regiment participated in the Fights on the Ukrainian–Russian border. A group under the command of Yuriy Kovalenko on two APCs provided intelligence to the Ukrainian military after commanding a crossing of the Mius River near Kozhevna. Near Dibrovka, the group discovered an enemy ambush, and a battle ensued. One special forces officer was killed, eight were wounded, two Mi-24s had to be called to help, which dealt a devastating blow to the militants.

In 2018, the regiment was awarded the honorary title "in the name of Prince Svyatoslav the Brave".

On 6 December 2021, to the 30th anniversary of the creation of the Armed Forces of Ukraine, 13 light armored HMMWV vehicles provided by the United States as part of logistical assistance were transferred to the 3rd Separate Special Purpose Regiment.

The 3rd separate special purpose regiment named after Prince Sviatoslav the Brave was transferred to the structure of the separate center of SSO "SKYD."

By decree of the President of Ukraine dated 29 July 2022, the center was awarded the honorary award "For Courage and Courage."

Structure

1997 

 2 Reconnaissance battalions
 2 Training companies (reconnaissance and communication)
 Company of material support
 Special weapons company
 Automobile company
 Special radio communication unit
 Cynological department

2017 

 Management, Headquarters
 1st Special purpose squad
 2nd Special purpose squad
 3rd Special purpose squad
 Security squad
 Communications unit

Commanders 

 (1992–1996) Colonel Ivan Yakubets
 (1996–1997) Colonel Serhiy Dokuchaev
 (2015) Colonel Vitaliy Pikulin
 (23.03.2016–03.11.2020) Colonel Oleksandr Trepak
 (from 03.11.2020) Colonel Mykhailo Krasotin

Losses 
As of summer of 2018, the regiment lost 44 servicemen.

Traditions 
By Decree of the President of Ukraine dated 22 August 2018 No. 232/2018, the regiment was given the honorary name "in the name of Prince Svyatoslav the Brave."

On 6 December 2019, during the celebrations on the occasion of the Day of the Armed Forces of Ukraine, the regimental battle song: "Song of the Brave" was presented to soldiers and guests at the regimental square. Its author is Svyatoslav Boyko, the leader of the band "Shirokyi Lan." He created the text of the work together with the servicemen of the regiment. "Song of the Brave" was played to the accompaniment of the regimental orchestra.

Ceremonies 
In August 2020, a symbolic harvest took place on the territory of the regiment. The wheat planted in the spring on the symbolic field of memory was collected with the help of sickles, part of it was threshed, and part of it was tied into bundles. Participants of the event were volunteers, military personnel and relatives of the victims. The same action took place in 2021.

Tribute

Awarded 
The highest state awards were awarded to:

 Yury Kovalenko – Lieutenant Colonel, Hero of Ukraine (posthumously).
 Oleksandr Trepak "Redoubt" – Colonel, Hero of Ukraine.

See also 

 Special Operations Forces (Ukraine)

Notes

Further reading 
 Victor Seversky, Кировоградский счёт: 3-й отдельный полк спецназа ГУР ГШ Украины (рос.) // Петро і Мазепа, 9 December 2015

External links 

 3-й окремий полк спеціального призначення  на сайті ГУР МО України
 До 2000 года в селе Первомайское располагась бригада спецназа (10 обрСпН)  (рос.)
 тренування 3-го оп СпП
 М.Жирохов Легендарні частини української армії: 3-й окремий полк спецпризначення в боях на Донбасі 
 СПЕЦНАЗ УКРАЇНИ
 https://censor.net.ua/resonance/393310/12_iyunya_2014_goda_pervyyi_boyi_za_saurmogilu_ogon_protivnika_na_saurmogile_byl_podavlen_ne_ponimayu  // «Цензор.нет», 15 June 2016.
 

Military special forces regiments
Military units and formations of Ukraine
1992 establishments in Ukraine
Military units and formations of Ukraine in the war in Donbas
Military units and formations established in 1992
Webarchive template wayback links